Norway was represented by 15-year-old Hanne Krogh, with the song "Lykken er", at the 1971 Eurovision Song Contest, which took place on 3 April in Dublin. "Lykken er" was chosen as the Norwegian entry at the Melodi Grand Prix on 20 February.

"Lykken er" marked Norway's return to Eurovision after their first of only two absences to date since their debut, when they were one of five nations to boycott the 1970 contest in protest at the four-way tie in 1969 and the fact that they (along with Finland and Sweden) considered that the voting system of the late 1960s tended to place the Nordic countries at a disadvantage.

Before Eurovision

Melodi Grand Prix 1971
The Melodi Grand Prix 1971 was held at the studios of the Norwegian Broadcasting Corporation in Oslo, hosted by Jan Voigt. Twelve songs took part in the final, with the winner chosen by a 14-member public jury who each awarded between 1 and 5 points per song. Other participants included past and future Norwegian representatives Inger Jacobsen, Odd Børre and Anne-Karine Strøm.

At Eurovision 
On the night of the final Krogh performed last in the running order, following Finland. Lyrically, "Lykken er" (translated as "Happiness Is") was little more than a list of pleasant things and experiences which Krogh enjoyed, leading to much comment that it was an overly-obvious attempt to replicate the previous year's winner "All Kinds of Everything", with a good dash of "My Favourite Things" from The Sound of Music thrown in for good measure. At MGP Krogh had performed in normal teenage attire, but in Dublin she sang dressed in a Victorian gown, complete with a parasol which she opened, closed and twirled throughout the song. At the close of voting "Lykken er" had picked up 65 points, placing Norway 17th of the 18 entries, ahead only of Malta. The poor result was largely attributed to the fact that the whole package of song, performance and presentation was much too cute, precious and twee for its own good, and was likely to have left a negative impression with the voters.

Voting

References

External links 
Full national final on nrk.no

1971
Countries in the Eurovision Song Contest 1971
1971
Eurovision
Eurovision